Jovial High School is a school near Yacharam in Ranga Reddy district, Telangana, India. The school was established in 2002 and it teaches up to Class 10.

Uniform 
Boys wear light yellow shirts and brown pants; girls wear light yellow shirts, brown pants, black shoes, and brown and light brown cross lined ties. Brown and light brown belts are also worn.

Celebrations 
The school celebrates all national functions and basic religious  functions.

Gallery

See also
Education in India
List of schools in India

References

External links 

2002 establishments in Andhra Pradesh
Educational institutions established in 2002
Ranga Reddy district
High schools and secondary schools in Telangana